Dannette Smith has been the chief executive officer of the Nebraska Department of Health And Human Services since February 2019.  Before that, she was the Director of Human Services for Virginia Beach, Virginia.

Biography
Smith earned an undergraduate degree from Eastern Michigan University in psychology and her MSW from the University of Illinois Chicago. At the Harvard Kennedy School, Smith completed the Child Welfare League of America’s child welfare leadership program.

Career
For the Council of State Governments, Smith co-chairs the Human Services Task Force Subcommittee.

Nebraska Governor Jim Pillen reappointed her CEO when he was elected in 2022.

References

State cabinet secretaries of Nebraska
Eastern Michigan University alumni
University of Illinois Chicago alumni
Harvard Kennedy School alumni
Living people
Year of birth missing (living people)
Place of birth missing (living people)
American women chief executives